Lekbeshi is an urban municipality located in Surkhet District of Karnali Province of Nepal.

The municipality is divided into total 10 wards.

The municipality was established on 10 March 2017, when Government of Nepal restricted all old administrative structure and announced 744 local level units as per the new constitution of Nepal 2015.

Lekhfarsa, Dasarathpur, Neta, Kalyan and Satokhani Village development committees were Incorporated to form this new municipality. The headquarters of the municipality is situated at Kalyan

Demographics
At the time of the 2011 Nepal census, 80.6% of the population in Lekbeshi Municipality spoke Nepali, 18.8% Magar, 0.2% Chhantyal, 0.2% Gurung and 0.1% Raji as their first language; 0.1% spoke other languages.

In terms of ethnicity/caste, 46.6% were Magar, 17.7% Chhetri, 15.0% Kami, 10.5% Hill Brahmin, 3.4% Damai/Dholi, 1.4% Thakuri, 1.3% Sarki, 1.3% Gurung, 0.6% Badi and 2.2% others.

In terms of religion, 88.8% were Hindu, 6.0% Christian, 5.0% Buddhist and 0.2% others.

References

External links
www.lekbeshimun.gov.np/

Populated places in Surkhet District
Municipalities in Karnali Province
Nepal municipalities established in 2017